Incantation is an American death metal band that was formed by John McEntee and Paul Ledney in 1989. They are one of the leaders in the New York City death-metal scene along with fellow bands Suffocation, Mortician and Immolation, even though the band is currently located in Johnstown, Pennsylvania. To date, the band has released ten full-length records, two live records, four EPs, two singles, three splits, one DVD, and three demos. Their most recent album, Sect of Vile Divinities, was released through Relapse Records in August 2020. The band have maintained a significant cult following and underground popularity since the '90s, and are considered to be highly influential on a range of later death metal bands including Dead Congregation, Grave Miasma, and Portal, who are often described as "cavernous death metal". Incantation's music frequently draws on anti-Christian, Satanic, and occult themes, and the band is notable for mixing widely varied tempos into their music, often playing slow, down-tuned passages similar to those performed by death-doom bands like Autopsy.

The band has seen many lineup changes in their -year history. Guitarist/vocalist McEntee is the sole original member, though drummer Kyle Severn has appeared on every studio album since their third full-length, Diabolical Conquest. Incantation first came to prominence with Onward to Golgotha and Mortal Throne of Nazarene, both of which feature Craig Pillard on vocals. Following the release of the Forsaken Mourning of Angelic Anguish EP in 1997, Pillard departed the band and was replaced by Daniel Corchado of The Chasm. Corchado performed on one album, 1998's Diabolical Conquest, before departing. Vocalist Mike Saez performed on the next two albums, The Infernal Storm (2000) and Blasphemy (2002). Beginning with Decimate Christendom, McEntee took on vocal responsibilities, a role that he continues to the present.

Band members

Current
John McEntee – lead guitar , rhythm guitar , vocals 
Kyle Severn – drums 
Chuck Sherwood – bass 
Luke Shively – lead guitar 

Former members
Brett Makowski – rhythm guitar 
Aragon Amori – bass 
Paul Ledney – drums, vocals 
Sal Seijo – drums 
Peter Barnevic – drums 
Will Rahmer – vocals 
Ronnie Deo – bass 
Jim Roe – drums 
Craig Pillard – vocals, rhythm guitar 
Dan Kamp – bass 
Daniel Corchado – bass, vocals 
Rob Yench – bass 
Mike Saez – vocals, rhythm guitar 
Joe Lombard – bass 
Alex Bouks – lead guitar 
Sonny Lombardozzi – lead guitar , rhythm and lead guitar 

Live musicians
Bill Venner – rhythm and lead guitar 
Dave Niedrist – bass 
Randy Scott – bass 
Duane Morris – rhythm and lead guitar, backing vocals 
Mike Donnelly – bass 
Mary Ciullo – bass 
Nathan Rossi – rhythm and lead guitar, backing vocals 
Kevin Hughes – bass 
Clay Lytle – drums 
Tom Stevens – rhythm and lead guitar, backing vocals 
Rick Boast – drums 
Richard Christy – drums 
Bill "Belial" Koblak – vocals, rhythm and lead guitar 
Vincent Crowley – vocals 
Rigel Walshe – bass 
Roberto Lizárraga – bass 
Reyash – bass 
Jacob Shively – bass 
Luke Shively – bass 
Dan Grainger – drums 
Charlie Koryn - drums 
Scott Pivarnick – bass 
Dan Vadim Von - bass 

Timeline

Discography

Studio albums
Onward to Golgotha (1992)
Mortal Throne of Nazarene (1994)
Diabolical Conquest (1998)
The Infernal Storm (2000)
Blasphemy (2002)
Decimate Christendom (2004)
Primordial Domination (2006)
Vanquish in Vengeance (2012)
Dirges of Elysium (2014)
Profane Nexus (2017)
Sect of Vile Divinities (2020)

Compilation albums
XXV (2016)
Unholy Massacre (2016)
Tricennial of Blasphemy (2022)

Rough Mix albums
Upon the Throne of Apocalypse (1995)
Blasphemous Cremation (2008)

EPs
Entrantment of Evil (1990)
Deliverance of Horrific Prophecies (1991)
The Forsaken Mourning of Angelic Anguish (1997)
Blasphemous Cremation (2008)

Singles
"Thieves of the Cloth" (2006)
"Scapegoat" (2010)
"Degeneration" (2012)

Splits
Relapse Singles Series Vol.1 (2002)
Relapse Singles Series Vol.3 (2004)
Afterparty Massacre (2011)
Reh & Live 1990 / Jesus Spawn (2013)

Live albums
Tribute to the Goat (1997)
Live Blasphemy in Brazil Tour 2001 (2001)
Rotting Spiritual Embodiment (2017)

References

Bibliography

External links

 

American death metal musical groups
Heavy metal musical groups from Pennsylvania
Relapse Records artists
Musical groups established in 1989
Articles which contain graphical timelines